Nykopp is a Finnish surname. Notable people with the surname include:

Aino Nykopp-Koski (born 1950), Finnish serial killer
Thomas Nykopp (born 1993), Finnish ice hockey player

Finnish-language surnames